Mauricius Ó Leaáin was Bishop of Kilmacduagh, Ireland, from 1254 to 1284. Ó Leaáin (O'Leane, Lane, Linnane) is associated with the Oranmore–Clarenbridge area of County Galway. He was the first of three men of the surname to become bishop of Kilmacduagh.

Ó Leaáin was elected before 15 May 1254 and received possession of the temporalities after that date. He died before 16 January 1284.

See also
 Seoán Ó Leaáin, Bishop of Clonfert, 1322–1336.
 Nicol Ó Leaáin, Bishop of Kilmacduagh 1358–1393.
 Gregorius Ó Leaáin, Bishop of Kilmacduagh, 1394–1397.

References

 The Surnames of Ireland, Edward MacLysaght, 1978.

People from County Galway
13th-century Roman Catholic bishops in Ireland